The Argentine Formula Renault Championship, formerly known as Formula Renault 2.0 Argentina and Formula Renault 1.6 Argentina, is an open wheel racing series founded in 1980. It is based in Argentina. In 2022 it was renamed Formula Nacional Argentina.

Regulations
Since 2010 the cars have been powered by a 2000cc Renault production engine. Prior to this (from the series' inception in 1980 to 2009) the cars were powered by a 1600cc Renault production engine. Tito is currently the only chassis make allowed. Similar Tito 02 cars are used in the Chilean Formula Three Championship.

Tyres are allocated to each driver in sets of 4 at each race meeting.

Champions
All champions were Argentine-registered.

References

External links
Fórmula Nacional Argentina official website

Formula Renault
Formula racing series
Auto racing series in Argentina